Settle Down may refer to:

"Settle Down" (Kimbra song)
"Settle Down" (No Doubt song)
"Settle Down" (The 1975 song)
"Settle Down", by Breaks Co-Op, from the album The Sound Inside (2005)
"Settle Down (Goin' Down That Highway)", a song written by Mike Settle
 Settle Down (album)